Jorge Hernández Diéguez (born 6 February 1992) is a Spanish footballer who plays for UP Langreo mainly as a winger.

Club career
Born in Sanzoles, Zamora, Castile and León, Hernández finished his formation at local Zamora CF, and made his senior debuts in the 2009–10 season in the Segunda División B, aged only 17.

On 27 June 2014 Hernández moved to neighbouring Real Valladolid, being initially assigned to the reserves also in the third level. He made his first-team debut on 7 September, replacing Óscar Díaz in the 74th minute of a 3–1 home win over Racing de Santander in the Segunda División.

Hernández left the Pucelanos in 2015, and signed for third-tier club Sestao River on 3 August of that year. The following 20 July, he moved to fellow league team CD Alcoyano.

References

External links

1992 births
Living people
Sportspeople from the Province of Zamora
Spanish footballers
Footballers from Castile and León
Association football wingers
Segunda División players
Segunda División B players
Zamora CF footballers
Real Valladolid Promesas players
Real Valladolid players
Sestao River footballers
CD Alcoyano footballers
Pontevedra CF footballers
Unionistas de Salamanca CF players
Internacional de Madrid players
UP Langreo footballers